Natasha Nicole Page (born 30 April 1985 in Gloucester) is a British rower who competed at the 2008 Summer Olympics and the 2012 Summer Olympics.

Rowing career
She finished fifth in the women's eight at the 2008 Olympic Games.  

She was part of the British squad that topped the medal table at the 2011 World Rowing Championships in Bled, where she won a bronze medal as part of the eight with Alison Knowles, Jo Cook, Jessica Eddie, Louisa Reeve, Lindsey Maguire, Katie Greves, Victoria Thornley and Caroline O'Connor.

She finished fifth in the women's eight at the 2012 Olympic Games.

Personal life
She is married to fellow Great Britain rower Sam Townsend.

References 

 
 

1985 births
Living people
English female rowers
British female rowers
Sportspeople from Gloucester
Rowers at the 2008 Summer Olympics
Rowers at the 2012 Summer Olympics
Olympic rowers of Great Britain
World Rowing Championships medalists for Great Britain